Eva & Leon (French title: L'Echappée Belle) is a 2015 French drama film written and directed by Émilie Cherpitel.
The movie was a submission to the 82nd Academy Awards for Best Foreign Language Film.

Plot
The movie is about a privileged woman and an orphaned boy who become friends.

Leon and his older brother, Arnaud, were abandoned in a park in Lyon.

They are seen as outcasts by a social worker, who considers both the brothers mentally ill and the only solution is sending them to a children’s home.

With the help of two teachers, Leon and Arnaud are put in an English-language school run by a kind but rough-around-the-edges teacher called Isabelle (Nicole Delecroix).

Cast 
 Clotilde Hesme as Eva 
 Florian Lemaire as Léon 
 Peter Coyote as The father 
 Keziah Jones as John
 Clotilde Courau as Lucie  
 Yannick Choirat as Simon 
 Idit Cebula as Madame Agostini  
 Grégoire Bonnet as a psychiatrist
 Joséphine de La Baume as Simone
 Christophe Dimitri Réveille as Jérôme 
 Frédéric Beigbeder as Richard
 David Serero as the Italian Crooner

References

External links 
 

2015 films
2015 drama films
2010s French-language films
French drama films
2015 directorial debut films
2010s French films